Alex Morgan (born 1989) is an American soccer player.

Alex Morgan may also refer to:
 Alex Morgan (Australian footballer) (born 1996), Australian rules footballer
 Alex Morgan (jetski racer), American jetski racer
 Alex Morgan (runner) (born 1972), Jamaican middle-distance runner

See also
 Alec Morgan (1908–1957), Australian rules footballer
 Alexander Morgan (disambiguation)